The Dean of the Thistle is an office of the Order of the Thistle, re-established in 1687. The office is normally held by a minister of the Church of Scotland, and forms part of the Royal Household in Scotland.

In 1886 the office of Dean of the Chapel Royal was revived and united by royal warrant to that of Dean of the Thistle, eventually being separated in 1969.

Office holders
1763: John Jardine (1716-1766)
1767: Robert Hamilton
1787: George Hill
1791: Archibald Davison
1803: William Laurence Brown
1830: George Cook
1845: William Muir (1787-1869)
1869: Norman Macleod  (1812-1872)
1872: John Macleod
1882: John Tulloch (1823-1886)
1886: James Cameron Lees (1834-1913)
1910-1926: Andrew Wallace Williamson (1856-1926)
1926-1969: Charles Laing Warr (1892-1969)
1969-1974: Dr Henry Charles Whitley (1906-1976)
1974-1989: Prof John McIntyre (1916-2005)
1989-2014: Gilleasbuig Iain Macmillan
2014–2019: The Very Rev Iain Torrance
2019-present: The Reverend Professor David Fergusson

 
Lists of office-holders in Scotland
St Giles' Cathedral